Nev Fountain, born Steven John Fountain (born 12 August 1969), is an English writer, best known for his comedy work with writing partner Tom Jamieson on the radio and television programme Dead Ringers.

Early life
A native of Stamford, Fountain attended the University of Warwick.

Career
While working at a series of odd jobs in London, Fountain wrote a few fringe plays, including one called My Grandmother Is a Time Lord, produced in 1995.  In the same year, he began writing sketches for the radio programme Week Ending.  It was while working on Week Ending that he met Tom Jamieson, with whom he has written most of his subsequent radio and television work.

Fountain and Jamieson contributed to many radio and television comedy programmes, including Have I Got News for You, 2DTV, The News Quiz, Loose Ends and Big Impression.  Their most notable work, however, has been for Dead Ringers in which Fountain occasionally makes cameo appearances.  The pair are also responsible for the historical comedy Elephants to Catch Eels and wrote "Txt Mssg Rcvd", a 2005 episode of the BBC Three anthology series Twisted Tales.

Private Eye
Fountain is also a staff writer on Private Eye magazine.

Doctor Who
Fountain is a fan of Doctor Who and has contributed to several audio dramas based on the programme.  His first licensed Doctor Who work was as script editor on the webcast Death Comes to Time.  He has also written several Doctor Who audio plays for Big Finish Productions, including Omega, The Kingmaker, and Peri and the Piscon Paradox. In addition, he wrote the narration script for the DVD documentary "The Last Chance Saloon" about the casting of Sylvester McCoy in the role in 1987. He appears occasionally as a host or MC at Doctor Who conventions.

In 2020, Radio Times announced that Fountain had adapted the audio story The Doomsday Contract for Big Finish, which had been originally pitched to the television series by comedy producer John Lloyd while Douglas Adams had been its script editor.

Novelist
Fountain is also a novelist, and has written three humorous detective books and one serious thriller.  The detective books, collectively titled 'The Mervyn Stone Mysteries', were published by Big Finish in 2010 and recount the exploits of an ex-script editor of science fiction television series called Vixens from the Void.  Mervyn Stone encounters murders wherever he goes, whether it be a sci-fi convention (Geek Tragedy), the recording of a DVD commentary (DVD Extras Include: Murder) or the revival of the aforesaid television series (Cursed Among Sequels).

The serious thriller is called Painkiller, published by Sphere, and recounts the story of Monica Wood, a woman suffering from chronic neuropathic pain who discovers her own suicide note in a drawer - but she cannot remember writing it.

Personal life
He lives in Shalford, Surrey.

Books

Mervyn Stone Mysteries
Geek Tragedy (2010)
DVD Extras Include: Murder (2010)
Cursed Among Sequels (2010)

Painkiller (Thriller) published by Sphere (2016)

Audio

Doctor Who
Omega (August 2003)
The Kingmaker (April 2006)
The Companion Chronicles: ‘Peri and the Piscon Paradox’ (January 2011)
Destiny of the Doctor: 'Trouble in Paradise' (June 2013)
Breaking Bubbles and Other Stories: 'The Curious Incident of the Doctor in the Night-Time' (July 2014)
The Widow's Assassin (October 2014)
The Diary of River Song Series 03: 'The Lady in the Lake' (January 2018)

Bernice Summerfield
The New Adventures of Bernice Summerfield: 'The Revolution' (June 2014)

Vienna
Bad Faith (February 2014)

The Confessions of Dorian Gray
The Immortal Game (August 2013)

Dark Shadows
The Eternal Actress (May 2012)
The Darkest Shadow (June 2014)

The Mervyn Stone Mysteries
The Axeman Cometh (June 2013)

References

External links

Nev Fountain at the BBC Comedy Guide
Nev Fountain and Tom Jamieson's website, including a full CV
Nev Fountain interview, focusing on Omega, at the BBC's Doctor Who site

1969 births
Alumni of the University of Warwick
English comedy writers
English radio writers
English satirists
English television writers
Living people
People from the Borough of Guildford
People from Stamford, Lincolnshire